A glaive (or glave) is a European polearm, consisting of a single-edged blade on the end of a pole. It is similar to the Japanese naginata, the Chinese guandao, the Korean woldo, and the Russian sovnya.

Overview
Occasionally, glaive blades were forged with a small hook on the reverse side to better catch riders. Such blades are called glaive-guisarmes.

According to the 1599 treatise Paradoxes of Defence by the English gentleman George Silver, the glaive is used in the same general manner as the quarterstaff, half pike, bill, halberd, voulge, or partisan. Silver rated this class of polearms above all other individual hand-to-hand combat weapons.

The Maciejowski Bible (Morgan Bible) depicts an example of a two-handed glaive used on horseback.

The contemporary term for this weapon may have been faussart, which was used for a variety of single-edged weapons seen as related to the scythe (along with terms such as falchion, falcata, or fauchard derived from falx, the Latin term for "scythe").

Other uses of the word
The word "glaive" has historically been given to several very different types of weapons.
 The word "glaive" originated from French. Almost all etymologists derive it from either the Latin (gladius) or Celtic (*cladivos, cf. claymore) word for sword. Nevertheless, all the earliest attestations in both French and English refer to spears. It is attested in this meaning in English roughly from the 14th century to the 16th century.
 In the 15th century, it acquired the meaning described above.
 Around the same time it also began being used as a poetic word for sword.
 In Modern French "glaive" refers to short swords, especially the Roman .
 The term "glaive" is used in the science fiction/fantasy film Krull to refer to a thrown weapon, similar to the chakram or hunga munga, which can return to the thrower, much like a boomerang. "Glaive" has been used to describe this fictional type of weapon in films, video games and other fantasy media since.

References

Medieval blade weapons
Medieval polearms
Polearms